:07 Seconds or Less: My Season on the Bench with the Runnin' and Gunnin' Phoenix Suns is a book written by Jack McCallum about the Phoenix Suns' 2005–06 NBA season.  It gives an inside look about the NBA team and its players, including Steve Nash and Shawn Marion, as well as the head coach, Mike D'Antoni, and his assistants.

The author of the book, Jack McCallum, joined Sports Illustrated in 1981 and became the chief NBA writer in 1985.

References

Basketball books
Phoenix Suns
2005–06 NBA season